Buffalo is a census-designated place (CDP) in Liberty Township, White County, in the U.S. state of Indiana. The population was 692 at the 2010 census.

History
Buffalo was platted in 1886, and named for Buffalo, New York, the native state of an early settler. The post office at Buffalo has been in operation since 1851.

Geography
Buffalo is located at  (40.885501, -86.740858).

According to the United States Census Bureau, the CDP has a total area of 2.5 square miles (6.6 km), of which 2.4 square miles (6.2 km) is land and 0.2 square mile (0.4 km) (6.27%) is water.

Demographics

2000 census
As of the 2000 United States Census, there were 672 people, 264 households, and 196 families in the CDP. There were 585 housing units at an average density of 245.3/square mile (94.5/km). The racial makeup of the CDP was 98.96% White, 0.89% from other races, and 0.15% from two or more races. Hispanic or Latino of any race were 2.38% of the population.

There were 264 households, out of which 27.7% had children under the age of 18 living with them, 62.9% were married couples living together, 4.9% had a female householder with no husband present, and 25.4% were non-families. 18.9% of all households were made up of individuals, and 11.0% had someone living alone who was 65 years of age or older. The average household size was 2.55 and the average family size was 2.79.

The population contained 24.4% under the age of 18, 6.4% from 18 to 24, 27.2% from 25 to 44, 23.4% from 45 to 64, and 18.6% who were 65 years of age or older. The median age was 41 years. For every 100 females, there were 104.3 males. For every 100 females age 18 and over, there were 107.3 males.

The median income for a household in the CDP was $29,583, and the median income for a family was $40,446. Males had a median income of $29,609 versus $14,423 for females. The per capita income for the CDP was $15,062. About 3.7% of families and 10.5% of the population were below the poverty line, including 13.4% of those under age 18 and 9.8% of those age 65 or over.

References

External links
 White County official website

Census-designated places in Indiana
Census-designated places in White County, Indiana